Anthony John Vaughan (born 11 October 1975) is an English former professional footballer who played as a defender/midfielder from 1994 until 2006.

He played Premier League football for Ipswich Town before moving into the Football League with Manchester City, Cardiff City, Nottingham Forest, Scunthorpe United, Mansfield Town, Barnsley and Stockport County. He also played in the Scottish Premier League for Motherwell and finished his career in non-league football with Hucknall Town.

Playing career
Vaughan was a product of the Manchester City youth scheme where he became a trainee. He later joined Ipswich as a youth, before making his full debut on 23 October 1994 against Chelsea at Stamford Bridge in the FA Premier League. He started 10 times in that season where Ipswich were eventually relegated from the top flight. He continued to play a big part as George Burley's team attempted to get back into the top flight. Vaughan scored his first goal on 2 April 1996 against Derby at home. His last appearance for Town was on 14 May 1997 at home against Sheffield United F.C. in the Division 1 playoff where Ipswich lost on away goals.

Manchester City manager Frank Clark made City fan Vaughan a pre season signing in 1997 for £1.35 million. He left for Nottingham Forest in 1999, where he scored once against Wimbledon in 43 league games. After loan spells at Scunthorpe United and Mansfield Town he moved to Scotland to play for Motherwell on loan in January 2003. At Motherwell he scored one goal against Dundee United in 12 games. Vaughan rejoined Mansfield, this time on a permanent basis, in the Summer of 2003, before ending his professional career at Barnsley, where he also had a loan spell at Stockport County (scoring once against Leyton Orient).

Personal life
Vaughan resided in Nottingham after his career came to an end, but now works for AKW Global as a driver.

References

External links

1975 births
Living people
English footballers
Association football defenders
Association football midfielders
Premier League players
Ipswich Town F.C. players
Manchester City F.C. players
Cardiff City F.C. players
Nottingham Forest F.C. players
Scunthorpe United F.C. players
Mansfield Town F.C. players
Motherwell F.C. players
Barnsley F.C. players
Stockport County F.C. players
Hucknall Town F.C. players
Association football utility players
People educated at Lostock High School